"" is the 23rd single by Zard and released 3 December 1997 under B-Gram Records label. The single debuted at #3 rank first week. It charted for nine weeks and sold over 331,000 copies.

Track list

Usage in media
My Baby Grand ~Nukumori ga Hoshikute~: used as commercial film song for company NTT DoCoMo of "DoCoMo 1997 Fuyu"

References

1997 singles
Zard songs
Songs written by Izumi Sakai
Songs written by Tetsurō Oda
1997 songs